The Mobile Brigade Corps abbreviated Brimob is the special operations, paramilitary, and tactical unit of the Indonesian National Police (Polri). It is one of the oldest existing units within Polri. Some of its main duties are counter-terrorism, riot control, high-risk law enforcement where the use of firearms are present, search and rescue, hostage rescue, and bomb disposal operations. The Mobile Brigade Corps is a large component of the Indonesian National Police trained for counter-separatist and counter-insurgency duties, often in conjunction with military operations.

The Mobile Brigade Corps consists of 2 (two) branches, namely Gegana and Pelopor. Gegana is tasked with carrying out more specific special police operations tasks such as: Bomb Disposal, CBR Handling (Chemistry, Biology, and Radioactivity), Anti-Terror (Counter Terrorism), and Intelligence. Meanwhile, the Pelopor are tasked with carrying out broader and paramilitary special police operations tasks, such as: Riot control, Search and Rescue (SAR), security of vital installations, and guerrilla operations. The Mobile Brigade Corps are capable of other operations that support the performance of general police units. The Brimob Corps is classified as a Police Tactical Unit (PTU) and is operationally a Police Special Weapons and Tactics (SWAT) unit (including Densus 88 and Gegana Brimob). Each regional police (Polda) in Indonesia has its own Mobile Brigade unit.

History
Formed in late 1945 as a special police corps named Pasukan Polisi Istimewa (Special Police Troops) with the task of disarming remnants of the Japanese Imperial Army and protecting the chief of state and the capital city. Under the Japanese, it was called  . It fought in the revolution and was the first military unit to engage in the Battle of Surabaya under the command of Police Inspector Moehammad Jasin.

On 14 November 1946, Prime Minister Sutan Sjahrir reorganised the Polisi Istimewa into the Mobile Brigade (Mobrig). This day is celebrated as the anniversary of this Blue Beret Corps. This Corps was reconstituted to suppress military and police conflicts and even coups d'etat.

On 1 December 1947, Mobrig was militarized and later deployed in various conflicts and confrontations like the PKI rebellion in Madiun, the Darul Islam rebellion (1947), the APRA coup d'état and proclamation of the Republic of South Maluku (1950), the PRRI rebellion (1953), and the Permesta (1958).

As of 14 November 1961, the Mobrig changed its name to Korps Brigade Mobil (Brimob), and its troops took part in the military confrontation with Malaysia in the early 1960s and in the conflict in East Timor in the mid-1970s. After that, Brimob was placed under the command of the Indonesian National Police.

The Mobile Brigade, which began forming in late 1946 and was used during the anti-Dutch Revolution, started sending students for US Army SF training on Okinawa in January 1959. In April 1960 a second contingent arrived for two months of Ranger training. By the mid-1960s the three-battalion Mobile Brigade, commonly known as Brimob, had been converted into an elite shock force. A Brimob airborne training centre was established in Bandung. Following the 1965 coup attempt, one Brimob battalion was used during anti-Communist operations in West Kalimantan. In December 1975 a Brimob battalion was used during the East Timor operation. During the late 1970s, Brimob assumed VIP security and urban anti-terrorist duties. In 1989, Brimob still contained airborne-qualified elements. Pelopor ('Ranger') and airborne training takes place in Bandung and at a training camp outside Jakarta.  Historically, Brimob wore the Indonesian spot camouflage pattern during the early 1960s as their uniform.

In 1981, the Mobile Brigade spawned a new unit called the "Jihandak" (Penjinak Bahan Peledak), an explosive ordnance disposal (EOD) unit.

Task

The Implementation and mobilization of the Brimob Corps is to cope with high-level interruption of society mainly: mass riots, organized crime armed with fire, search and rescue, explosives, chemicals, biological and radioactive threats along with other police operational implementing elements in order to realize legal order and peace of society throughout juridical of Indonesia and other tasks assigned to the corps.

Qualifications
The Pelopor qualifications, which are the basic capabilities of every Brimob member, are the following basic skills:

 Ability to navigate with map and compass
 Intelligence
 Anti-terror (counter-terrorism)
 Riot control
 Guerrilla war, Close / Urban war tactics
 Bomb disposal
 Handle high intensity crimes where the use of firearms is present
 Search and rescue
 Surveillance, disguise and prosecution.
 Other individual and unit capabilities.

Function

The function of the Police's Mobile Brigade Corps as the Polri's Principal  Operating Unit which has specific capabilities (Riot control, Combat Countermeasures, Mobile Detective, Counter-terrorism, Bomb Disposal, and Search and Rescue) in the framework of High-level domestic security and community-supported search and rescue personnel who are well trained and have solid leadership, equipment and supplies with modern technology.

Role
The role of Brimob is together with other police functions is to act against high-level criminals, mainly mass riots, organized crime of firearms, bombs, chemicals, biology and radio active threats in order to realize the legal order and peace of society in all juridical areas of Indonesia. Roles undertaken include:

Role to help other police functions,
Role to complement in territorial police operations carried out in conjunction with other police functions,
Role to protect members of other police units as well civilians who are under threat,
Role to strengthen other police functions in the implementation of regional operational tasks,
Serve to replace and handle territorial police duties if the situation or task objective has already led to a high-grade crime.

Organisation

In 1992 the Mobile Brigade was essentially a paramilitary organisation trained and organised along military lines. It had a strength of about 12,000. The brigade was used primarily as an elite unit for emergencies and supporting police operations as a rapid response unit.
The unit was mainly deployed for domestic security and defense operations, but now has gained and achieved many specialties in the scope of policing duties such as implementing SWAT operations, Search and Rescue operations, Riot control and CBR (Chemical, biological and radiological) defense. Brimob also are usually sent to do domestic security operations with the TNI.

Since the May 1998 upheaval, PHH (Pasukan Anti Huru-Hara, Anti Riot Unit) have received special anti-riot training. Elements of the unit are cross trained for airborne and Search and Rescue operations. In each Police HQ that represents a province (which is known as POLDA) in Indonesia each has an organized BRIMOB force which consists of a command headquarters, several Detachments of Pelopor police personnel organized into a regiment and usually 1 or 2 detachments of GEGANA.

The Chief of the Indonesian National Police, known as KAPOLRI, has the highest command in each police operation including BRIMOB, orders are delivered by the police chief and then executed by his Operational Assistant Agent with then further notification to the Corps Commandant and then to the concerned regional commanders.

Units
 Corps HQ and HQ Services
 Brimob Corps Training School
 Gegana Unit
 Pelopor Brigade
 Brigade HQ 
 II (2nd) Pelopor Regiment
 III (3rd) Pelopor Regiment
 IV (4th) Pelopor Regiment
 Training Command

Pelopor

Pelopor (lit."Pioneer") is the main reaction force of the Mobile Brigade Corps, it acts as a troop formation and has the roles of mainly riot control and conducting paramilitary operations assigned to the corps to cope with high-level threat of society disturbance. It also specializes in the field of Guerrilla, and Search and Rescue (SAR) operations. There are three national regiments of Pelopor in the Brimob corps which are:
II Pelopor Regiment
III Pelopor Regiment
IV Pelopor Regiment

In a historical view, this unit was called as "Brimob Rangers" during the Post Independence era. In 1959, during its first formation, Brimob Rangers troops conducted a test mission in the area of Cibeber, Ciawi and Cikatomas which borders Tasikmalaya-Garut in West Java. It was the baptism of fire of the Rangers, in which the newly acquired skills of guerrilla warfare and counter-insurgency operations were applied against remnants of Darul Islam in these communities. The actions against the Islamic Army of Indonesia (TII) units in the province weakened the DI even further, leading the total collapse of the local DI provincial chapter in 1962, ending a decade-long war of violence there.

The official first forward deployment of the Brimob Rangers was the Fourth Military Operations Movement in South Sumatra, West Sumatra and North Sumatra (in response to the Permesta rebellion of 1958). It was the Brimob Rangers troops became part of the Bangka Belitung Infantry Battalion led by Lieutenant Colonel (Inf) Dani Effendi. Rangers were tasked to capture the remains of the PRRI prison in Sumatra's forests led by Major Malik, which was then under rebel hands.

In 1961, under the express orders of then Chief of Police General Soekarno Djoyonegoro, Brimob Rangers troops were officially renamed Pelopor Troops of the Mobile Brigade. This is in accordance with the wishes of President Sukarno who wanted Indonesian names for units within both the TNI (Indonesian National Armed Forces) and POLRI (Indonesian National Police). At this time also the Pelopor constables and NCOs received many brand new weapons for police and counter-insurgency operations, including the more famous AR-15 assault rifles. The subsequent assignment of this force was to infiltrate West Irian in Fak-Fak in May 1962 and engage in combat with the servicemen of the Royal Netherlands Army. The troops were also involved in the Confrontation of Malaysia in 1964 and at that time the Brimob Rangers troops (now Pelopor) in Indonesia faced the British Special Air Service.

Now the Pelopor Troops plays a role as a troop formation unit and is still active in the Brimob's operational system. Aside from the national regiments, each Police region has a Pelopor regiment of two to four battalions.

Gegana

Gegana is a special branch detachment within the Brimob corps which have special abilities mainly in bomb disposal and counter-terrorist operations. On the other hand, it also specializes in the field of hostage rescue, intelligence and CBR (Chemical, biological and radiological) defense. The national Gegana unit is organized into a battalion headquarters and (five) detachments which are:

Intelligence Detachment
Bomb Disposal Detachment
Anti-Terror Detachment
Anti-Anarchist Detachment
CBR (Chemical, biological and radiological) Detachment

This unit was formed in 1976 as a detachment. At first, it was meant to deal with aircraft hijacking. Later in 1995, with the expansion of Brimob, the Gegana Detachment was expanded to become the 2nd BRIMOB Regiment. However, there are a select few specialists who are very skilled in these specialties. Gegana does not have battalions or companies. The regiment is broken down into several detachments. Within each detachment they are split into sub-detachments (sub-den), and within each sub-den they are further sub-divided into several units. Each unit usually consists of 10 personnel. One sub-den consists of 40 personnel, and one detachment consists of about 280 personnel.

One operation is usually assigned to one unit. Therefore, from the 10 people in that unit, six are required to have special skills: two for EOD (Explosives and Ordnance Disposal), two for search and rescue operations, and two for counter-terrorist operations. In any operation, two experts are designated Operators One and Two while the rest of the unit members become the Support Team.

For example, in counter-terrorism operations, the designated Operators must have sharp-shooting skills, ability to negotiate, and be an expert in storm-and-arrest procedures. These skills and operations are not meant to be lethal because the main goal of every Gegana operation is to arrest suspects and bring them to the court. Unless there is a situation that Gegana has to do otherwise, there will be no shooting.

In Search and Rescue operations, the personnel are required to have the basic capabilities of diving, rappelling, shooting, and first aid. In anti-bomb operation, the Operators have to be the expert in their respective fields. Each Gegana personnel has been introduced to various types of bombs in general, including the risks of handling them. There are specific procedures for handling each bomb, including the required timing.

Currently, Gegana has three Explosive Ordnance Disposal (EOD) tactical vehicles.

Unit composition
Brimob units are present in all 34 Regional Police Headquarters (Polda) in Indonesia which represent a province. In each BRIMOB unit of a Police HQ in a province (Polda), there are about several detachments of MBC Pelopor units (organized into a regiment) and usually 1 - 2 detachment of Gegana (small battalions or companies). 

A Brimob unit of a regional police headquarters consists of the following:
Regional Mobile Brigade HQ Section (Si-yanma)
Planning and Administration Section (Subbagrenmin)
Intelligence Section (Si-intel)
Operational Section (Si-ops)
Provost (Internal affairs) Section (Si-provos)
Communications Technology Section (Si-tekkom)
Medical and Fitness Section (Si-kesjas)
Search and Rescue (SAR) Unit
Pelopor Regiment composed of:
 Regional Pelopor Regimental HQ
A Detachment (Den-A)
B Detachment (Den-B)
C Detachment (Den-C)
D Detachment (Den-D) (large departments only)
 Support units
Gegana Detachment (Den Gegana)
 Detachment HQ
 1-3 Subdetachments/Platoons

For some regional police headquarters, Pelopor detachments only consists up-to "C" Detachments only (3 battalions each). But for bigger regional police HQs such as the Jakarta Regional Metropolitan Police (Polda Metro Jaya), it consists up-to "D" Detachment with a total of four (4) detachments. Each Pelopor Detachment consists of 4 (four) Companies, and each Company consists of 3 (three) Platoons. The Gegana detachment is organized as a company in most police regions, but in larger ones is organized as a full battalion of two detachments and a headquarters unit.

Gallery

See also
 Detachment 88 or Densus 88, Indonesian special counter-terrorism squad

References

External links 
 Video about Brimob
 51 Tahun Si Baret Biru
  February 1962 – Summer 1963: In to Action
 Gegana Operators In Action on Instagram

1946 establishments in Indonesia
Specialist law enforcement agencies of Indonesia
Non-military counterterrorist organizations
Bomb disposal
Non-military counterinsurgency organizations